Flavia Pennetta was the defending champion but lost to Kaia Kanepi in the final 6–4, 6–3.

Seeds

Draw

Finals

Top half

Bottom half

References
Main Draw
Qualifying Draw

Internazionali Femminili di Palermo - Singles
Internazionali Femminili di Palermo